Supermodel of the World is the debut studio album by American singer and drag queen RuPaul, released on June 8, 1993 by Tommy Boy Records. It is his second album overall, his first release being a soundtrack album. With the release of the Supermodel of the World album, RuPaul obtained higher celebrity status, notably due to the album's first single, "Supermodel (You Better Work)". Before the release of this album, he had done some modeling work as a drag queen, hence the album title.

Background

African American actress/comedian LaWanda Page (best known as Aunt Esther on the television series Sanford and Son) is featured in spoken word clips on several album tracks, though she is heard most notably on the track "Supermodel (You Better Work)".  That song's chorus also features RuPaul repeating the phrase "Sashay! Shantay!"  When asked about the meaning of "shantay", RuPaul replied that the term means "to weave a friend" (from the French "enchanté" which means nice to meet you).   The term had previously appeared in the 1990 drag ballroom documentary Paris Is Burning. It also sounds like the french expression "Sachez chanter!", at the imperative form, meaning "Know how to sing!"

The album was reissued on Rhino Records.

Singles
The album's first single, "Supermodel (You Better Work)", was a huge club and dance hit that peaked at number 45 on the Billboard Hot 100 and achieved Gold sales status. It also reached number 39 in the UK Singles Chart. The video for the song was put into heavy rotation on MTV; this was a huge surprise to RuPaul and his record label as, at the time, the music being heavily played on MTV was grunge, gangsta rap, and rock. In addition to the success of "Supermodel (You Better Work)", "Back to My Roots" charted at number one on the Billboard Club/Dance Play Songs Chart on July 24, 1993 and number 40 in the UK Singles Chart, where it was backed with "House of Love" as a double A-side. "A Shade Shady (Now Prance)" also charted at number one on the Billboard Club/Dance Play Songs on October 9, 1993.

Critical reception

Robert Christgau wrote in his "Consumer Guide" column for The Village Voice: "I know it wouldn't be an authentic disco album without filler, but this self-creation is too blandly male a singer to put over pro forma romance. The exception is 'Supernatural,' as you'll figure out if you match title to persona and consider the possibilities. And when he cops an attitude—on five cuts by my count, culminating in the deep-dish 'A Shade Shady'—he brings off a time-warped genderfuck all his own."

Alex Henderson from AllMusic wrote in retrospect: "A colorful transvestite and icon of African-American gay culture whose outrageous sense of humor never seems to let up, RuPaul could arguably be described as 'The Little Richard of '90s Dance Music.' But RuPaul isn't the novelty act some have dismissed him as being. Boasting a decent vocal range and a strong passion for '70s disco/soul, RuPaul is a bona fide dance/house music artist whose debut album, Supermodel proved him to be a definite asset to '90s house and R&B. When he tears into 'Supermodel (You Better Work)' and other overtly '70s-influenced dance-floor gems, RuPaul shows himself to be a sweaty, emotional belter who projects a lot more soul and honest emotion than most of the cookie-cutter artists dominating '90s urban-contemporary radio. Hopefully, those able to look past his wild image will come to realize how good a singer he is."

Commercial performance
The album peaked at number 109 on the US Billboard 200.

Track listing

Personnel

RuPaul – vocals
LaWanda Page – performer
Fred Schneider – performer
 Jimmy Harry – horn, vocals, producer, engineer
Uptown Horns – horn
Tom Coyne – mastering
Seiji – mixing
Fenton Bailey – executive producer
Randy Barbato – executive producer
Erwin Gorostiza – art direction
Lan Yin – design
Mark Contratto – photography
Mathu – make-up, hair stylist, stylist
Zaldy – make-up, stylist, hair

Eric Kupper – backing vocals, producer, engineer, mixing
Karen Bernod – backing vocals
Betty Cooper – backing vocals
Chavonie Cooper Vocals – backing vocals
Trenise Y. Haddock – backing vocals
Vincent Haddock, Jr. – backing vocals
Angela M. Hadock – backing vocals
Kevin E. Ien – backing vocals
Leon King – backing vocals
Lisa Lowell – backing vocals
Mark Mancini – backing vocals
Sherryl Marshall – backing vocals
William L. Richardson, Jr. – backing vocals
Carole Sylvan – backing vocals

Chart positions

See also
RuPaul speaks about society and the state of drag as performance art

References

1993 debut albums
RuPaul albums
Tommy Boy Records albums
Hi-NRG albums